Xu Xiaoyan may refer to:
 Xu Xiaoyan (general)
 Xu Xiaoyan (rugby union)